Anna Chakvetadze was the defending champion, but chose not to participate that year.

Nadia Petrova won in the final 6–2, 6–1, against Nathalie Dechy.

Seeds

Draw

Finals

Top half

Bottom half

External links
Draw and Qualifying Draw

2008 Western & Southern Financial Group Masters and Women's Open
Western and Southern Financial Group Women's Open